Asta (Estonian: Aste) was a Soviet air base in Estonia located near the town of Aste,  north of Kuressaare. It is on Saaremaa Island, and was listed on the 1974 Department of Defense Global Navigation Chart No. 3 as having jet facilities. It was probably a front-line interceptor or dispersal base.  In the 1980s or 1990s it was plowed under. Very little of the base remains.

References

RussianAirFields.com

Soviet Air Force bases
Buildings and structures in Saaremaa
Saaremaa Parish
Defunct airports in Estonia